Kevin M. Kopelow (born June 28, 1963 in Los Angeles, California) and Heath Seifert (born 1968 in Los Angeles, California) are an American television writing and producing team. They have written and produced All That, Kenan & Kel, and Cousins for Life for Nickelodeon and Austin & Ally for Disney Channel, among other series. They also created the latter two.

As an actor, Kopelow is best known for appearing as Kevin, the stage manager on All That, as well as appearing as a panelist on the game show Figure It Out.

Filmography

Writers
Good Burger 2 (2023)
Warped! (2021, also creators)
Cousins for Life (2018–2019, also creators)
Nickelodeon's Ho Ho Holiday Special (2015)
Austin & Ally (2011–2016, also creators)
Star and Stella Save the World (2007)
All That 10th Anniversary Reunion Special (2005)
Stripperella (2003–2004)
100 Deeds for Eddie McDowd (2002)
KaBlam! (1996–1998)
Kenan & Kel (1996–2000)
All That (1994–2000, 2019–2020)
Two Heads Are Better Than None (2000)
1999 Kids' Choice Awards (1999)
Good Burger (1997)
Space Cases (1996)
Singled Out

Producers
Good Burger 2 (2023)
Warped! (2021)
Cousins for Life (2018–2019, also writers)
Austin & Ally (2011–2016, also writers)
Jonas (2009)
Sonny with a Chance (2009)
Campus Ladies (2006–2007)
Star and Stella Save the World (2007)
Hi-Jinks (2005–2006)
Stripperella (2003)
Kenan & Kel (1996–2000)
All That (1994–2005, 2019–2020)
Cousin Skeeter (1998–2001)
Good Burger (1997)

Kopelow as an actor
All That (1994–2005, 2019–2020) - Kevin the Seasons 1-6 Stage Manager (1995-2000)
Kenan & Kel (1996–2000) - Paramedic #2, Party Decorator
Good Burger (1997) - Sad Clown
Figure It Out (1997–1999) - Himself/panelist

References

External links

American male screenwriters
American television producers
American television writers
Living people
Screenwriting duos
Showrunners
American male television writers
Year of birth missing (living people)